The Republican Movement was a political party in Switzerland between 1971 and 1989.

History
The party was formed by James Schwarzenbach as a breakaway from the National Action against the Infiltration of People and Homeland party in 1971. It received 4.3% of the vote in the elections that year, winning seven seats. However, in the 1975 elections the party's share of the vote fell to 3% and it was reduced to four seats. The 1979 elections saw the party lose the majority of its support as it was reduced to 0.6% of the vote and won only one seat. It saw another fall in its vote share to 0.5% in the 1983 elections, but retained its single seat. In 1987 its vote share fell to just 0.3% and it lost its only seat. The party was subsequently dissolved on 22 April 1989. Most of its members joined the Federal Democratic Union.

Platform
The Republican Movement supported anti-immigrant and anti-establishment policies, as well as fundamentalist Protestant Christian views.

Affiliations
In 1972 the Republican Movement officially associated itself with the anti-immigrant Vigilance, which was founded in 1964 and based in the Canton of Geneva. They presented themselves as an electoral alliance three years later.

References

Bibliography
 

Political parties established in 1971
Political parties disestablished in 1989
1971 establishments in Switzerland
1989 disestablishments in Switzerland
Defunct political parties in Switzerland